Hurley is a town in Grant County, New Mexico, United States. The population was 1,297 at the 2010 census, down from 1,464 in 2000.

Geography
Hurley is located in east-central Grant County at  (32.699594, -108.128629). U.S. Route 180 passes through the town, leading north  to Bayard, and southeast  to Deming and Interstate 10.

The Grant County Airport and the hamlet and ranch of Apache Tejo are approximately three miles south of Hurley.

The large, open pit Chino Mine and its related facilities lie just to the east of Hurley.

Demographics

As of the census of 2000, there were 1,464 people, 563 households, and 407 families residing in the town. The population density was 1,433.0 people per square mile (554.2/km2). There were 650 housing units at an average density of 636.2 per square mile (246.0/km2). The racial makeup of the town was 71.79% White, 0.14% African American, 2.05% Native American, 0.07% Asian, 23.43% from other races, and 2.53% from two or more races. Hispanic or Latino of any race were 60.31% of the population.

There were 563 households, out of which 29.5% had children under the age of 18 living with them, 53.1% were married couples living together, 13.9% had a female householder with no husband present, and 27.7% were non-families. 23.8% of all households were made up of individuals, and 13.0% had someone living alone who was 65 years of age or older. The average household size was 2.60 and the average family size was 3.08.

In the town, the population was spread out, with 26.5% under the age of 18, 8.2% from 18 to 24, 22.0% from 25 to 44, 24.2% from 45 to 64, and 19.1% who were 65 years of age or older. The median age was 38 years. For every 100 females, there were 92.1 males. For every 100 females age 18 and over, there were 85.2 males.

The median income for a household in the town was $27,404, and the median income for a family was $31,181. Males had a median income of $29,667 versus $16,528 for females. The per capita income for the town was $11,999. About 14.4% of families and 15.6% of the population were below the poverty line, including 23.4% of those under age 18 and 8.8% of those age 65 or over.

Popular culture
Scenes from the action Western film The Lone Ranger were filmed in locations around Hurley.

See also

 List of municipalities in New Mexico

References

External links

Towns in Grant County, New Mexico
Towns in New Mexico